Stewart Davidson (1 June 1886 – 26 December 1960) was a Scottish professional football  who played as a right half for Aberdeen and Middlesbrough.

Early and personal life
Davidson was born in Aberdeen on 1 April 1889. He worked as a legal clerk.

Career
After playing for Aberdeen, Davidson was signed by Middlesbrough manager Tom Mcintosh on 17 April 1913 for a fee of £675. He played 76 league games across two seasons prior to the outbreak of World War One. During the war, Davidson played as a wartime guest player for Manchester City, and although wounded during the war, was able to continue his football career after the end of the war in 1918. He became Middlesbrough club captain in 1920, and earned his first and only cap for Scotland against England in 1921.

In summer 1923, Davidson was deemed surplus to requirements at Middlesbrough and returned to his former club Aberdeen. He was later player-manager of Forres Mechanics and coached for the Kent F.A., before became assistant manager to ex-teammate Billy Birrell at Chelsea from 1939 to 1957.

References

1886 births
1960 deaths
Footballers from Aberdeen 
Scottish footballers
Scottish football managers
Association football wingers
Aberdeen F.C. players
Middlesbrough F.C. players
Forres Mechanics F.C. players
Manchester City F.C. wartime guest players
Highland Football League players
Chelsea F.C. non-playing staff
Scottish Football League players
Scotland international footballers
English Football League players
Association football wing halves